The Chesney Gold Medal is an award given by the Royal United Services Institute awarded to "any especially eminent work calculated to advance the military sciences and knowledge".

List of Medallists 
The following people have received the Chesney Gold Medal:

	1900: Captain Alfred Thayer Mahan USN
	1907: Major General Sir John Frederick Maurice
	1909: The Hon J.W. Fortescue
	1910: Sir John Knox Laughton
	1911: Professor C.W.C. Oman
	1913: Colonel Sir Lonsdale Augustus Hale
	1914: Sir Julian Corbett
	1919: Major General E.D. Swinton
	1921: Major General Sir Charles Callwell
	1924: Professor G.A.R. Callender
	1925: Captain Sir George Arthur
	1926: Vice Admiral Sir Herbert Richmond
	1927: Brigadier-General Sir James E. Edmonds
	1928: L.G. Carr-Laughton
	1929: Colonel H.C. Wylly
	1930: Dr C.E.W. Bean
	1931: Commander C.N. Robinson
	1932: Colonel C. de W. Crookshank MP
	1936: Professor Spenser Wilkinson
	1950: The Rt Hon Winston Churchill
	1955: Sir Arthur Bryant
	1963: Major General J.F.C. Fuller and Captain Basil Liddell Hart
	1965: Marshal of the Royal Air Force Sir John Slessor
	1968: Professor Arthur J. Marder
	1973: Professor Michael Howard
	1975: Captain Stephen W. Roskill RN
	1981: John Terraine and Ronald Lewin
	1985: General Sir John Hackett
	1991: Correlli Barnett
	1997: Henry Paget, 7th Marquess of Anglesey
	2000: Baroness Thatcher 
	2006: Sir Lawrence Freedman
	2013: General David H. Petraeus

References 

British science and technology awards